The 1976 U.S. Senate election for the state of North Dakota was held November 2, 1976. The incumbent, North Dakota Democratic NPL Party (Dem-NPL) Senator Quentin Burdick, sought and received re-election to his fourth term to the United States Senate, defeating Republican candidate Robert Stroup.

Only Burdick filed as a Dem-NPLer, and the endorsed Republican candidate was Robert Stroup, as state senator from Hazen, North Dakota. Burdick and Stroup won the primary elections for their respective parties.

One independent candidate, Clarence Haggard, also filed before the deadline under the American Party.

Election results

See also 
 1976 United States Senate elections

Notes

External links
1976 North Dakota U.S. Senate Election results

North Dakota
1976
United States Senate